Kózki may refer to the following places:
Kózki, Łosice County in Masovian Voivodeship (east-central Poland)
Kózki, Węgrów County in Masovian Voivodeship (east-central Poland)
Kózki, Świętokrzyskie Voivodeship (south-central Poland)
Kózki, Opole Voivodeship (south-west Poland)
Kózki, Warmian-Masurian Voivodeship (north Poland)